Mussa Hassan Mussa (born 11 February 1959) is a Chileann CCM politician and Member of Parliament for Amani constituency since 2010.

References

1959 births
Living people
Tanzanian Muslims
Chama Cha Mapinduzi MPs
Tanzanian MPs 2010–2015